McVille may refer to:

Places

United States
 McVille, Indiana
 McVille, Kentucky
 McVille, North Dakota
 McVille, Pennsylvania

Other
 The McCrary House, a historic farm house near Huntsville, Alabama, United States

See also
Macville Township, Aitkin County, Minnesota, United States